Ivan Skoropadsky (1646 – 3 July 1722) was a Cossack Hetman of the Zaporizhian Host (in office: 1708–1722), and the successor to the famous Hetman Ivan Mazepa.

Biography

Born into a noble Cossack family in Uman, Ukraine in 1646, Skoropadsky was educated in Kyiv-Mohyla Academy. In 1675 he joined Cossack military service under Hetman Ivan Samoylovych and distinguished himself in Russo-Turkish War of 1676–1681 and once again in the Crimean expedition against the Ottoman Empire and Crimean Khanate in 1688.

Ivan Skoropadsky was briefly an ambassador representing Cossack Hetmanate in negotiations with the Russian Tsar Peter the Great. During the Great Northern War Skoropadsky was a Cossack colonel of the Ukrainian Starodub regiment and after Swedish army crossed into Ukraine in 1708, refused to join Ivan Mazepa who decided to switch sides and fight against Russia. Only about 3,000 Cossacks, mostly Zaporozhians, followed Mazepa, while others remained loyal to the Tsar. With Mazepa deposed, Ivan Skoropadsky was elected as new Hetman on 11 November 1708. The fear of other reprisals and suspicion of Mazepa's newfound Swedish ally Charles XII prevented most of Ukraine's population from siding with the rebels.

Ivan Skoropadsky moved the capital of the Cossack Hetmanate from Baturyn which was razed by the Russian army for Mazepa's rebellion, to the town of Hlukhiv. Following Mazepa's defeat in the Battle of Poltava, Skoropadsky thought to regain Peter I's trust and yet negotiate greater autonomy for the Hetmanate and greater rights for the Cossack nobility, often resisting Peter the Great's policy of incorporation of the Hetmanate lands into the Russian Empire. His careful negotiations allowed him to achieve both, and the Hetmanate regained much of its lost prominence.

In 1718 his daughter married Count Pyotr Pyotrovich Tolstoy, the son of Pyotr Andreyevich Tolstoy (a prominent Russian statesman) and Ivan Skoropadsky was granted numerous estates in Ukraine becoming its largest land-owner. The Hetman had no male children but Pavlo Skoropadsky, a descendant of his brother, briefly ruled Ukraine 200 years later, and also carried the title of Hetman in his Hetmanate-influenced government.

See also
 Hetmans of Ukrainian Cossacks
 Skoropadsky family

References

External links
 Ivan Skoropadsky at the Encyclopedia of Ukraine

Hetmans of Zaporizhian Host
National University of Kyiv-Mohyla Academy alumni
1646 births
1722 deaths
People from Uman
People from Bracław Voivodeship
Zaporozhian Cossack nobility
Colonels of the Cossack Hetmanate